Helen Louise Leake  (born 15 December 1949) is an Australian film producer, who was CEO of the South Australian Film Corporation from 2004 to 2007.

She was born Helen Louise Mann in Adelaide, South Australia, and was educated at Seymour College and Flinders University.

In 1994, she founded Duo Art Productions with Craig Lahiff, and they produced the films Ebbtide (1994), Heaven's Burning (1997), Black and White (2002) and Swerve (2011) with Lahiff directing. In 2013, Leake produced Wolf Creek 2, a sequel to Greg McLean's 2005 horror thriller.

From 2004 to 2007, Leake served as CEO of the South Australian Film Corporation, having served on the corporation's board since 2001.

In 2014, Leake founded Dancing Road Productions with Gena Ashwell. The company is producing an upcoming biographical film about Sir John Monash.

At the 2020 Australia Day Honours, Leake was made a Member of the Order of Australia for significant service to film, and to professional organisations.

References

External links

Duo Art Productions
Dancing Road Productions

1949 births
Living people
Australian film producers
Australian women film producers
Flinders University alumni
Members of the Order of Australia
People from Adelaide